Dominic Allen  (born 20 November 1980) is an Australian director and producer whose work includes short and feature films, music videos, commercials, and television documentaries.

In 2005 he was featured in the documentary film RASH, as an Australian street artist.

His documentary films include Estudio 101, about eclectic Australian band The Cat Empire recording their second album in Cuba; One Cup, about Fair Trade Coffee and East Timor; and Squeezed, about the impact of Trade Liberalisation in Asia. In 2009 he had success with a short film titled Two Men and he won the Melbourne International Film Festival Emerging Australian Filmmaker Prize, and the 2009 Inside Film Awards Rising Talent Award.

As a producer of feature films Allen's credits include Shadowplay, 2009,  Blind Company, 2009 and Grey Matter, 2011, a Rwandan feature film Directed by Kivu Ruhorahoza premiering at Tribeca 2011.

References

External links 
 
 Squeezed Website
 Scarab Studio
News paper Article
 Short film "Two Men" at Dooce

1980 births
Living people
Australian film producers
Australian screenwriters
Film directors from Melbourne